New Zealand has contested 46 Miss World pageants since that pageant's inception in 1951.  No New Zealander has won the Miss World title, although two have placed first runner-up.

History
The peak of the national pageant's popularity was in the 1980s when the event was televised on TVNZ. Interest waned in the 1990s as the contests suffered from political correctness, faced opposition from feminists and struggled to gain sponsorship.  From 2005 to 2007 no national pageant was held; in 2007 an Auckland community trust bought the franchise and the pageant was held to select the country's representative to Miss World 2008 was held in May 2008.

Titleholders
Color key

The winner of Miss New Zealand represents her country at Miss World. On occasion, when the winner does not qualify (due to age) for either contest, a runner-up is sent.

Miss International New Zealand
Since 2010 the second title of Miss World New Zealand represents her country at Miss International. On occasion, when the winner does not qualify (due to age) for either contest, a contestant is sent. In 2003-2008 the official candidate selected by Miss International New  Zealand pageant. New Zealand debut in 1960 and ever won the title of Miss International 1971, Jane Hansen in Long Beach, California, United States.

Former titles

Miss Earth New Zealand
From 2003 to 2010, the third title of Miss World New Zealand organized by Miss World New Zealand Ltd., to compete at Miss Earth pageant. On occasion, when the winner does not qualify (due to age) for either contest, a contestant is sent. Starting 2011, New Zealand's representative to Miss Earth is selected through the Miss New Zealand Festival of Beauty, organized by the New Zealand Asia Pacific Trust which also selects representatives to Miss World and Miss International under the direction of Rose Foulger, who took on the Miss Earth franchise from Mrs Taylor upon her retirement. In 2013 Miss Earth New Zealand was held in separate pageant.

Notes

Miss Universe
The delegates who represented New Zealand at Miss World 1991-1995 also represented New Zealand at Miss Universe the year after they competed at Miss World. The only one of these delegates to place at Miss World was Lisa Marie de Montaulk, who was a semi-finalist in both pageants.

References

External links
Official Miss World New Zealand website

Miss World
New Zealand